Paraegopis is a genus of gastropods belonging to the family Zonitidae.

The species of this genus are found in the Balkans.

Species:

Paraegopis albanicus 
Paraegopis bizonus 
Paraegopis mauritii 
Paraegopis oberwimmeri 
Paraegopis skipetaricus

References

Zonitidae